The MYCRO-1 was a microcomputer manufactured and sold by Mycron of Oslo, Norway. Built around the Intel 8080 CPU, it was one of the first commercial single-board computer after the Intel SDK-80. One is currently displayed at the Norwegian Museum of Science and Technology.

When introduced it was sold for apx. $6.000

MYCRO-1 is a microcomputer system based on the microprocessor Intel 8080. Some models have an Z80 CPU. Since the Z80 is backward compatible with the 8080, this was probably a cost reduction measure. The MYCRO-1 system was designed by MYCRON Data Industri as an entry In the market place for higher powered microcomputer systems.

A typical basic configuration of the system:
 DIM-1001 CPU
 DIM-1013 16K Byte Dynamic RAM
 DIM-1090 Chassis with Motherboard
 DIM-1091 Power Supply with Switch Panel

The modules available for the MYCRO-1 system

Computer modules
 DIM-1001 CPU (8080)
 DIM-1003 CPU (Z80)
 DIM-1027 High Speed Slave CPU

Memory modules
 DIM-1010 4K Byte Static RAM
 DIM-1012 4K Byte PROM
 DIM-1013 16K Byte Dynamic RAM
 DIM-1014 6K Byte EPROM
 DIM-1015 16K Byte Static RAM
 DIM-1016 64K Byte Dynamic RAM

Input/output modules
 DIM-1019 Dual Serial I/O, Synchronous/Asynchronous
 DIM-1020 4 Channel Serial I/O
 DIM-1021 Two Input and Two Output Parallel I/O
 DIM-1022 Triple Serial I/O Module
 DIM-1030 Floppy Disc Controller
 DIM-1031 Floppy Disc Controller
 DIM-1035 12M Byte Disk Drive

Process control modules
 DIM-1023 32 Channel Digital Input Module
 DIM-1025 8 Channel Pulse Counter Module
 DIM-1026 16 Channel Digital Output Module
 DIM-1029 16 Channel Level Detector Input Module
 DIM-1042 16 Channel Analog Input Modules
 DIM-1043 8 Channel Analog Output Module
 DIM-1044 16 Channel Analog Diff. Amp. Input

Data storage
 DIP 11133 Single Floppy Disk Drive Unit
 DIP 11134 Double Floppy Disk Drive Unit

Mycro-1 modules
 DIM-1090 Chassis with Motherboard
 DIM-1091 Power Supply with Switch Panel

Pheripherals
 DIP-1022 Display
 DIP-1023 Teletype

Software
 DIS 1001 PROCOM
 DIS 1002/1022 MYCRA One-Pass Assembler
 DIS 1003 Editor Text Page Editor
 DIS 1007 Diskette Service Package
 DIS 1010/1018 Floating Point Software Packages
 DIS 1011 Basic Interpreter
 DIS 1012 DDS Diskette Dataset Support
 DIS 1014 Mycrop Diskette Based Monitor
 DIS 1015 EPROM Programmer Routines
 DIS 1018 Floating Point Software Package
 DIS 1019 QEdit Text Editor
 DIS 1020 Multi-Access Disk Driver
 DIS 1021 Mycrop with Remote Disk Access
 DIS 1024 Fast Floating Ooint Micro Program for DIM 1027
 DIS 1024E Communication Package for Nord-10
 DIS 1027 MyMon. A real-Time and Time-Sharing Monitor for Mycro-1
 DIS 1029 PL/Mycro Resident One-Pass Compiler
 DIS 1030 DINIT Diskette Initialization Program
 DIS 1031 GRTS 115/Mycro-1 Emulator
 DIS 1032 Trace - A Software Debugging Tool
 DIS 1033 MyReg System for Data Registration on Diskette
 DIS 1034 Utility Routines on the Mycron System Diskette
 DIS 1035 Pas 80 Sequential Pascal Compiler
 DIS 1036 DLSM Dataset Label Maintenance

References

External links
 Picture of a MYCRO-1 with additional floppy controller board
A Facebook page to discuss the MYCRO-1
Pictures of a MYCRO-1
Book: PL/MYCRO: a resident PL/M compiler for MYCRO-1

References

Mycro-1
Single-board computers
Mycron computers